Denis Glennon is a Gaelic footballer from Tyrrellspass, County Westmeath, Ireland who plays for the Westmeath county team. His younger brother David was also a member of the senior panel but is currently living abroad.

Glennon is considered to be one of the finest talents the county has ever produced. He first appeared on the national scene in 2004.

He is among his county's highest championship scorers.

Career
Glennon was part of the Westmeath team that win the 2004 Leinster Senior Football Championship, he also won a National Football League Div 2 title in 2008. In 2011 he was made captain of the Westmeath team for the year.  

He plays his club football with Tyrrellspass, winning Westmeath Senior Football Championship medals in 2006 and 2007.  He also played in the Leinster Senior Club Football Championship final in 2007 however Tyrrellspass lost out to Dublin side St Vincents.

Honours
Leinster Senior Football Championship (1): 2004
National Football League, Division 2 (1): 2008
Westmeath Senior Football Championship (2): 2006, 2007

References

Year of birth missing (living people)
Living people
Donegal Boston Gaelic footballers
Gaelic football forwards
Tyrrellspass Gaelic footballers
Westmeath inter-county Gaelic footballers